The 1996 Special Honours in New Zealand were two Special Honours Lists, published on 29 February and 23 September 1996, recognising the outgoing governor-general, and appointing officials within the New Zealand Order of Merit.

Companion of the Queen's Service Order (QSO)

Additional, for public services
 Her Excellency Dame Catherine Anne Tizard  – Principal Companion of the Queen's Service Order and Governor-General and Commander-in-Chief in and over New Zealand since 1990.

New Zealand Order of Merit

Appointment of officials
 Janet Marie Warren Shroff . To be Secretary and Registrar of the New Zealand Order of Merit.
 Phillippe Patrick O’Shea  – New Zealand Herald of Arms Extraordinary. To be Herald of the New Zealand Order of Merit.

References

Special honours
New Zealand special honours